Buigiri is an administrative ward in the Dodoma Rural District of the Dodoma Region of Tanzania.

Wards of Dodoma Region